Liu Hao (born 7 November 1988) is a Chinese professional racing cyclist, who currently rides for UCI Continental team . He rode at the 2015 UCI Track Cycling World Championships. He won stage three of the 2013 Tour de Korea. He also rode at the 2014 Asian Games.

Major results
2020
 2nd Time trial, National Road Championships

References

External links

1988 births
Living people
Chinese male cyclists
Place of birth missing (living people)
Asian Games medalists in cycling
Cyclists at the 2014 Asian Games
Olympic cyclists of China
Cyclists at the 2016 Summer Olympics
Asian Games gold medalists for China
Medalists at the 2014 Asian Games
Chinese track cyclists
21st-century Chinese people